Bar Shapochnikov (born June 12, 1999 in Israel) is an Israeli individual and group rhythmic gymnast. She is the 2020 European Group All-around champion.

Career

Senior
In 2017, she became senior and joined Israeli senior group. She made her World Championship debut at the 2018 World Championships in Sofia, Bulgaria, where she placed 15th in Group All-around. Her second World Championships participation was in 2019 in Baku, where she and her teammates placed 6th in Group All-around, 4th in 5 Balls final and 6th in 3 Hoops + 4 Clubs.
In November 2020, they won gold medal at the 2020 European Championships in Group All-around and silver in Team competition.

References

External links
 
 
 

Israeli rhythmic gymnasts
1999 births
Living people
Medalists at the Rhythmic Gymnastics European Championships